Santa Maria Island or Santa María Island may refer to:

 Santa Maria Island, in the archipelago of the Azores, Portugal
 Santa María Island, Chile in the Bío Bío Region of Chile
 Santa Maria Island was an old name for Gaua in the Pacific

Other
 Floreana Island, also called Santa María, located in the Galápagos, Ecuador